Charles Root may refer to:

 Charlie Root (1899–1970), American right-handed pitcher in Major League Baseball
 Charles Boudinot Root (1818–1903), American silversmith
 Charles W. Root, American lawyer and politician in Minnesota